Shah Nazari (also Romanized as Shah Naz̧arī) is a village in Tashan-e Sharqi Rural District, Tashan District, Behbahan County, Khuzestan Province, Iran. At the 2006 census, its population was 168, in 32 families.

References 

Populated places in Behbahan County